Tim McInnerny (born 18 September 1956) is an English actor. He is known for his many roles on stage and television, including as Lord Percy Percy and Captain Darling in the 1980s British sitcom Blackadder.

Early life
McInnerny was born on 18 September 1956 in Cheadle Hulme, Cheshire, the son of Mary Joan (née Gibbings) and William Ronald McInnerny. He was brought up in Cheadle Hulme, and Stroud, Gloucestershire, and educated at Marling School, a grammar school in Stroud, and read English at Wadham College, Oxford, matriculating in 1976 after taking a gap year backpacking around the world.

Career

Television 
McInnerny's first role was in Blackadder during the 1980s. He played the two bumbling related aristocrats with the same name of Lord Percy Percy in the first series (The Black Adder) and the second series (Blackadder II); he declined to appear in the third series for fear of being typecast, though he did make a guest appearance in one episode and returned to play Captain Kevin Darling in the fourth series (Blackadder Goes Forth), a character significantly different from the Lords Percy.

He had a minor but significant role in the highly acclaimed 1985 BBC TV serial Edge of Darkness as Emma Craven's boyfriend Terry Shields. Recent TV appearances include Law & Order: UK (2011) as a man wrongly convicted of murdering his daughter, and  New Tricks (2012). In 2016, McInnerny joined the cast of the HBO series Game of Thrones in Season 6 as Lord Robett Glover.

In 2007 McInnerny spoke candidly about his love of ITV sitcoms, after receiving criticism for his views expressed on the BBC cult show I Love the '70s: "I think shows like Mind Your Language and Love Thy Neighbour need to be remembered for what they were; truly fantastic examples of sitcom writing that hasn't been seen since. The content is unfortunate in the cold light of modern society, but that's no reason to stop praising the sheer brilliance of the writers that ITV had in its ranks during that decade."

Television

Film
{|class="wikitable"
|-
! Year
! Title
! Role
! Notes
|-
| 1983
| Dead on Time
| Customer
| Short film
|-
| 1985
| Wetherby
| John Morgan
|
|-
| 1989
| Erik the Viking
| Sven the Berserk
|
|-
| 1995
| Richard III
| William Catesby
|
|-
| 1996
| 101 Dalmatians
| Alonzo
|
|-
| 1997
| FairyTale: A True Story
|John Ferret
|
|-
| rowspan="2"|1999
| Rogue Trader
|Tony Hawes
|
|- 
| Notting Hill
| Max
|
|-
| 2000
| 102 Dalmatians
| Alonzo
|
|-
| 2001
| The Emperor's New Clothes
| Dr. Lambert
|
|-
| 2005
| Casanova
| The Doge
|
|-
| 2006
| Severance
| Richard
|
|-
| 2008
|  The Devil's Whore
|  Joliffe
|  
|-
| 2010
| Black Death
| Hob
|
|-
| 2011
| Johnny English Reborn
| Patch Quartermain
| 
|-
| 2014
| The Minister of Chance
| The King
| 
|-
| 2014
| Automata
| Vernon Conway
| 
|-
| 2015
| Spooks: The Greater Good
| Oliver Mace
| 
|-
| 2016
| Eddie The Eagle
| Target
|
|-
| 2017
| The Hippopotamus
| Roddy
|
|-
| rowspan="3" |2018
|Agatha and the Truth of Murder
| Randolph
|
|-
|Peterloo
| Prince Regent
|
|-
|Sometimes Always Never
|Arthur
|
|-
| rowspan="2" | 2019
| Killers Anonymous
| Calvin
|
|-
| The Aeronauts
| Airy
|
|-
| 2022
| Marooned Awakening
| Karl
| Voice
|-
| 2022
| Stromboli
| Harold
| 
|-
| TBA
| Banking on Mr. Toad| Dr. Cyril Evans
|
|}

Radio

Theatre
He played Dr. Frank-N-Furter in the 1990 West End production of The Rocky Horror Show. His performance can be heard on the soundtrack album of this production.

He was cast in Pravda alongside Anthony Hopkins.

In summer 2007, he played Iago in Othello at Shakespeare's Globe on Bankside in London.

Selected theatre performances

 Clitandre in The Misanthrope by Moliere. Directed by Casper Wrede at the Royal Exchange, Manchester. (1981)
 Charlie in Detective Story by Sidney Kingsley. Directed by John Dillon at the Royal Exchange, Manchester. (1982)
 Billy Bibbitt in One Flew Over The Cuckoo's Nest by Dale Wasserman. Directed by Greg Hersov at the Royal Exchange, Manchester.  (1982)
 Mick in The Caretaker by Harold Pinter. Directed by Richard Negri at the Royal Exchange, Manchester. (1983)
 Orsino in Twelfth Night''. Directed by Braham Murray at the Royal Exchange, Manchester. (1988)

Music
In 1989, he co-starred with Kate Bush in the music video for her song "This Woman's Work". He also appeared in the Westlife video for "Uptown Girl", along with Claudia Schiffer, Robert Bathurst, Crispin Bonham-Carter, Ioan Gruffudd and James Wilby. Since 2012, McInnerny has also been a patron of the Norwich Film Festival.

References

External links
 

1956 births
Living people
20th-century English male actors
21st-century English male actors
Actors from Cheshire
Actors from Greater Manchester
Alumni of Wadham College, Oxford
British male comedy actors
English male film actors
English male radio actors
English male stage actors
English male television actors
Male actors from Gloucestershire
People educated at Marling School
People from Cheadle Hulme
People from Stroud